Healthy food describes food that is believed to contribute to personal or public health, and may refer to:

a healthy diet
food safety
a particular health food